Megachile nigripennis is a species of bee in the family Megachilidae. It was described by Spinola in 1841.

References

Nigripennis
Insects described in 1841